The Liguilla of the 2011 Primera División de México Apertura is a final knockout tournament involving eight teams of the Primera División de México. The tournament will begin on November 19, 2011 and will end on December 11, 2011. The winners and runners-up of the competition will qualify for the 2012–13 CONCACAF Champions League.

Teams
In a change from previous seasons, the 18 teams in the 2011 Apertura were not divided into three groups of six teams each. Instead, the eight best teams in the general table qualified for the competition.

Bracket
The eight qualified teams play two games against each other on a home-and-away basis. The winner of each match up is determined by aggregate score.

The teams were seeded one to eight in quarterfinals, and will be re-seeded one to four in semifinals, depending on their position in the general table. The higher seeded teams play on their home field during the second leg.

 If the two teams are tied after both legs, the higher seeded team advances.
 Both finalist qualify to the 2012–13 CONCACAF Champions League Group Stage.

Quarter-finals
The first legs of the quarterfinals were played on November 19 and 20. The second legs were played on November 26 and 27.

Kickoffs are given in local time (UTC-6 unless stated otherwise).

First leg

Second leg

Semi-finals
The first legs of the semifinals were played on November 30 and December 1. The second legs were played on December 3 and 4.

Kickoffs are given in local time (UTC-6 unless stated otherwise).

First leg

Second leg

Final

The first leg of the final will be played on December 8, the second leg on December 11.

Kickoffs are given in local time (UTC-6 unless stated otherwise).

First leg

Second leg

References